Tmolus is a Neotropical genus of butterflies in the family Lycaenidae. The genus was erected by Jacob Hübner in 1819.

Species
Tmolus crolinus Butler & H. Druce, 1872
Tmolus cydrara (Hewitson, 1868)
Tmolus echion (Linnaeus, 1767)
Tmolus mutina (Hewitson, 1867)
Tmolus ufentina (Hewitson, 1868)
Tmolus venustus (H. H. Druce, 1907)

References

Eumaeini
Lycaenidae of South America
Lycaenidae genera
Taxa named by Jacob Hübner